The following is a list of Nippon Professional Baseball players with the last name starting with K, retired or active.

K

References

External links
Japanese Baseball

 K